Yana Sergeyevna Romanova (born 11 May 1983) is a retired Russian biathlete. She competed in various events at the 2010 and 2014 Winter Olympics and won a silver medal in the 4×6 km relay in 2014. Her medal was later annulled for doping violations.

Career
Romanova was awarded the Medal of the Order "For Merit to the Fatherland" I class in 2014. In May 2015, she retired from competitions. In April 2016, she became a candidate to participate in the primaries of the United Russia party in the Omsk Oblast for the elections to the State Duma.

In December 2016, the International Biathlon Union provisionally suspended her for doping violations during the 2014 Winter Olympics, along with Olga Vilukhina. On 27 November 2017, the International Olympic Committee disqualified Vilukhina and Romanova, banned them for life from the Olympics, and stripped them of their Olympic medals. On 24 September 2020, Romanova and Vilukhina's disqualifications in the individual races were overturned by the CAS, and their medals were restored.

References

External links

 Profile on biathlonworld.com
 Statistics

1983 births
Living people
People from Kurgan, Kurgan Oblast
Russian female biathletes
Russian sportsperson-politicians
Biathletes at the 2010 Winter Olympics
Biathletes at the 2014 Winter Olympics
Olympic biathletes of Russia
Recipients of the Medal of the Order "For Merit to the Fatherland" I class
Doping cases in biathlon
Russian sportspeople in doping cases
Competitors stripped of Winter Olympics medals
Sportspeople from Kurgan Oblast